VTV was one of the first Slovak private TV channels. It started broadcasting on 22 April 1995 via the Eutelsat 2F2 satellite (position 10° East) in analogue, free-to-air form. Since the overwhelming majority of Slovak satellite receivers were fixed on the Astra satellite at 19.2° east, VTV failed to get enough viewers and ended with bankruptcy in January 2000.

External links
Unofficial page describing the channel history

Television in Slovakia
Independent television stations
Television channels and stations established in 1995
Television channels and stations disestablished in 2000
1995 establishments in Slovakia
2000 disestablishments in Slovakia